Serince can refer to:

 Serince, Elâzığ
 Serince, Lice
 Serince, Sincik